La Zizanie is a 2001 album recorded by French pop singer Zazie. It was her fourth studio album and her fifth album overall. It was released on 16 October 2001 and achieved success in francophone countries. It provided five singles (two of them were only released as promotional singles) including two hits: "Rue de la paix" (#11 in France and Belgium) and "Adam & Yves" (#22 in France), and the minor hit "Danse avec les loops" (#53 in France).

Zazie wanted first to entitle the album "La Zazizanie" without mentioning her name on the cover but this idea was finally cancelled because it was not a concept album. The limited edition was presented in an octagonal set box.

Chart performance and accolades
The album went straight to number-one in France on 20 October 2001 and totaled ten weeks in the top ten and 55 weeks on the chart (top 200). In Belgium (Wallonia), the album debuted at #4 on 27 October 2001, then climbed to number-one. It remained for 14 weeks in the top ten and 34 weeks in the top 50. In Switzerland, the album was ranked for 15 weeks, including a peak at #28 in its first week of release, on 28 October 2001.

The album was nominated in the category 'Pop album of the year' at the 2002 Victoires de la Musique.

Track listing
All songs written and composed by Zazie except where noted.

Credits and personnel
 Acoustic and electric guitar : Pierre Jaconelli
 Bass : Nicolas Fiszman
 Drums : David Salkin
 Digital editing : Manu Goulet
 Mixing assistant : Sylvain Carpentier
 Engineer : Pete Schwier
 Mastering  : Tim Young
 Pre-production : Jean-Pierre Pilot and Pierre Jaconelli

Charts

Certifications and sales

References

2001 albums
Zazie albums